The 1841 East Surrey by-election was polled on 12 February 1841.  It was fought due to the death of the incumbent Conservative MP Richard Alsager.

Nominations
The 9 February public hearing of nominations or hustings, chaired by the under-Sheriff, Mr Abbot, duly took place the day after paper submissions closed, at the Fairfield, Croydon.  The ground was "pretty well occupied" by over 2000 supporters by 11am, the start time.  Hustings were erected and wagons of respective supporters drew up on the straw-laid ground; with pale blue and white widespread for Alcock and orange and purple displayed for Antrobus, beyond their carriages and among their musicians.

The Morning Chronicle'''s reporter wrote he believed Lord Leveson intended to nominate Alcock but he arrived after the meeting, and covered the third spoken speech in support of Alcock, by a Mr Coates. It concluded a show of hands took place, taken to have fallen to Mr Alcock but a poll was, as was habitual, demanded for a week's time.  Antrobus ultimately won, by 2,652 to 1,438 votes.

The Morning Post ran a report titled "East Surrey Election [new line] Triumph of Conservatism" acerbic of the "present ministers", describing the stated party of Alcock as Liberal 'misnamed' and him as a "Whig-Radical".  It adds 200 of most Conservative-leaning electors met together at The Horns'', chaired by W. Nottidge who toasted the new member's health.  There were in that inn cheers to many comments of Antrobus including "by the majority by which the election of East Surrey had been won, the Government had been taught a lesson they would not easily forget".

References

1841 elections in the United Kingdom
1841 in England
19th century in Surrey
By-elections to the Parliament of the United Kingdom in Surrey constituencies